Justin Roberts (born 4 December 1996) is a Bahamian tennis player.

Roberts has a career high ATP singles ranking of 753 achieved on 16 September 2019. He also has a career high ATP doubles ranking of 908 achieved on 16 November 2020. Roberts has won one ITF singles title and one ITF doubles title on the tour. 

Roberts represents Bahamas at the Davis Cup, where he has a win–loss record of 1–0.

References

External links
 
 
 
 Justin Roberts at Arizona State University

1996 births
Living people
Bahamian male tennis players
Sportspeople from Nassau, Bahamas
Tennis players at the 2014 Summer Youth Olympics
Arizona State Sun Devils men's tennis players